East International Baccalaureate High School, known as East High School and Pueblo East High School, is one of thirteen public high schools in Pueblo, Colorado, United States. It offers the International Baccalaureate program. It is a part of Pueblo School District 60.

Athletics

Fall sports

Boys
Cross country
Golf
Football
Soccer
Tennis

Girls
Cross country
Softball
Volleyball

Winter sports

Boys
Basketball
Wrestling

Girls
Basketball
Swimming and diving

Spring sports

Boys
Baseball
Track & field
Swimming and diving

Girls
Golf
Soccer
Tennis
Track & field

Notable alumni

 Nat Borchers - Major League Soccer player
 Dan DeRose - businessperson, football player
 Darius Allen - Professional Football Player

References

External links
 

Public high schools in Colorado
Schools in Pueblo County, Colorado
Buildings and structures in Pueblo, Colorado
International Baccalaureate schools in Colorado
1959 establishments in Colorado